Giv (also Romanized as Gīv; also known as Gīr) is a village in Ashtian County, Markazi Province, Iran. At the 2006 census, its population was 572, in 165 families.

References 

Districts of Markazi Province